The transvolcanic deer mouse (Peromyscus hylocetes) is a species of rodent in the genus Peromyscus of the family Cricetidae found only in Mexico.

Habitat
The Transvolcanic deer mouse is found from west central Jalisco eastwards to Mexico City and north Morelos in Mexico.

References

External links
Mammal Species of the World

Peromyscus
Mammals described in 1898
Taxa named by Clinton Hart Merriam
Endemic mammals of Mexico
Fauna of the Trans-Mexican Volcanic Belt